Mayadin Sports Club is a Syrian football club based in Mayadin. It was founded in 1975. They play their home games at the Mayadin Stadium. Their best performances were in 1997–1998 and 1998–1999 respectively, when they managed to play in the Syrian Premier League.

References

Mayadin
Association football clubs established in 1975
1975 establishments in Syria